Eichmann Before Jerusalem: The Unexamined Life of a Mass Murderer is a book by Bettina Stangneth originally published in German in 2011. An edition in English appeared in 2014.

The work challenges Hannah Arendt's portrayal of Adolf Eichmann in Eichmann in Jerusalem: A Report on the Banality of Evil as an unintelligent and thoughtless bureaucrat. Stangneth proposes that Eichmann's actions were the results of intentional, well-thought-out decisions of a man who strongly subscribed to Nazi ideology and who took pride in his actions.

References 

2011 non-fiction books
Books about Nazism
Adolf Eichmann